Jaume Plensa i Suñé (born 23 August 1955) is a Spanish visual artist, sculptor, designer and engraver. He is a versatile artist who has also created opera sets, video projections and acoustic installations. He worked with renowned Catalan theatrical group La Fura dels Baus. He is better known for his large sculptures made up of letters and numbers.

Biography

Plensa was born in Barcelona, Catalonia, Spain. He left the studies of fine arts in Barcelona and continued to train in a self-taught way.

Works
Plensa's works include the Crown Fountain at Millennium Park in Chicago, Illinois, which opened in July 2004. The fountain is composed of a black granite reflecting pool placed between a pair of glass brick towers. In the summer of 2007, he participated in the Chicago public art exhibit, Cool Globes: Hot Ideas for a Cooler Planet.

Another Plensa piece is Blake in Gateshead in North East England, a laser beam that on special occasions shines high into the night sky over Gateshead's Baltic Centre for Contemporary Art.

In 2007, working closely with a group of local ex-miners, he was also commissioned to create a new work on the landmark site of a former colliery near St Helens, Merseyside, as part of the Big Art Project, a major national public art initiative linked to Channel 4. The structure is coated in sparkling white Spanish dolomite, as a contrast to the coal which used to be mined there.

On 16 June 2008, Plensa's sculpture of a listening glass entitled Breathing was dedicated by the incumbent Secretary-General of the United Nations, Ban Ki-moon, as a memorial to journalists killed whilst undertaking their work. The sculpture in steel and glass sits atop a new wing of Broadcasting House in London. At 22:00 GMT each evening a beam of light will be projected from the sculpture extending 1 km into the sky for 30 minutes to coincide with the BBC News at Ten.

In 2010, Plensa's Alchemist was installed in front of the Stratton Student Center, facing the main entrance of the Massachusetts Institute of Technology in Cambridge, Massachusetts. It is a large, hollow seated figure similar to other contemporary Plensa figures, except that it is composed of numerals and mathematical symbols, to honor MIT's traditional STEM-focused teaching and research. The sculpture was donated anonymously on the occasion of MIT's 150th anniversary.

El alma del Ebro was created for the International Exposition in Zaragoza, the theme of which was "Water and Sustainable Development". It is eleven meters high, the sculpted letters representing cells of the human body which is over 60% water. Its white letters and hollow structure invite the viewer to look inside and reflect on the relationship between human beings and water. A similar sculpture entitled Singapore Soul (2011) was installed in front of the Ocean Financial Centre in Singapore. And an ensemble piece entitled I, You, She, He... with three figures composed of the letters, each seated on large flat boulders, can be seen at the Frederik Meijer Gardens & Sculpture Park, in Grand Rapids, Michigan.

From May to mid-August 2011, the work Echo was displayed in Madison Square Park in Manhattan.

In November 2012, the Albright–Knox Art Gallery in Buffalo, New York unveiled a 32-ton sculpture by Plensa called Laura.

In 2013, Plensa installed a sculpture named Ainsa I at the entrance of the Olin Business School of Washington University in St. Louis.

In 2017, Love  was installed in the Frisian city of Leeuwarden, Netherlands, as the city was the European Capitol of Culture in 2018.

In 2019, the MACBA Museum of Contemporary Art Barcelona organized the most ambitious solo exhibition in his hometown, curated by the museum's director, Ferran Barenblit. The exhibition traveled to the Museum of Modern Art Moscow, where it achieved notable success. 

In 2020, Dreaming was installed outside of the Richmond-Adelaide Centre in Toronto. Also in 2020, Behind the Walls was installed outside the University of Michigan Museum of Art.

Water's Soul (2021) is along the Hudson River Waterfront Walkway in the Newport section of Jersey City.

Awards 
 1993: Medaille des Chevaliers des Arts et Lettres by the French Minister of Culture
 1996: Awarded by the Fondation Atelier Calder
 1997: National Award of Arts by the Government of Catalonia
 2005: Investit Doctor Honoris Causa by School of the Art Institute of Chicago
 2009 : Marsh Award for Excellence in Public Sculpture.
 2012: Creu de Sant Jordi Award
 2012: National Award for Plastic Arts
 2013: Premio Nacional de Arte Gráfico
 2013: Premio Velázquez de Artes Plásticas, by Ministerio de Cultura de España

Gallery

See also
Looking Into My Dreams, Awilda
 Tolerance (sculpture), Houston, Texas (2011)

References

External links
 Official site of Jaume Plensa
 https://www.thecollector.com/jaume-plensa-sculptor-art/
Video: Artist Profile of Jaume Plensa from the Virginia Museum of Fine Arts

1955 births
Living people
Artists from Catalonia
People from Barcelona
Spanish contemporary artists
Spanish sculptors
21st-century Spanish artists
20th-century Spanish artists
Sculptors from Catalonia
20th-century Catalan people